Insilicos is a life science software company founded in 2002 by Erik Nilsson, Brian Pratt and Bryan Prazen.  Insilicos develops scientific computing software to provide software for disease diagnoses.

Technology 
Insilicos' key technologies includes pattern recognition techniques to interpret proteomics mass spectrometry data. Insilicos products include InsilicosViewer and Insilicos Proteomics Pipeline (IPP).  These products support the mzXML, mzDATA and mzML file formats. In 2007, Insilicos received a grant from the National Human Genome Research Institute to further develop software allowing for studies to be conducted more quickly. The open-source software, developed in connection with the Institute for Systems Biology, has been referred to as the Trans Proteomic Pipeline. IPP is commercial version of the Trans-Proteomic Pipeline

References 

Science software
Software companies established in 2002
Software companies based in Seattle
2002 establishments in Washington (state)
Software companies of the United States
Companies established in 2002
2002 establishments in the United States